Sherman Friedland was Associate Professor of Fine Arts as well as an active clarinetist, professor of music and conductor at Concordia University in Montreal from 1960 until his retirement in 1997. He was conductor and Music Director of the Concordia University Symphony for 17 years, and was clarinetist, director and founder of the Concordia Chamber Players. Sherman Friedland died January 26, 2017.

Career
Sherman Friedland was born in Brooklyn, N.Y. in 1933, and attended Brookline High School from 1947-51. After serving as a bandsman in the U.S. Army, he attended Boston University, studying with Gino Cioffi at the New England Conservatory of Music, as well as with Rosario Mazzeo. He graduated in 1960 with a Bachelor of Music degree.

He was appointed Principal Clarinetist of the Milwaukee Symphony in 1961 and studied at Le Conservatoire Americain. He studied with Marcel Jean in Paris, and studied chamber music with Mademoiselle Nadia Boulanger. He was awarded the Diplome cum Laundes in Clarinet by Mlle. Boulanger in 1960. He organized the Milwaukee Symphony Wind Quintet, which served as Quintet in Residence at Fontainbleau during the summer of 1963.

At the University of Massachusetts in Amherst, he earned a Master of Music and was appointed Fromm Fellow at the Berkshire Music Center in 1964, where he performed as soloist in the Concerto for Clarinet and Orchestra by Easley Blackwood, conducted by Gunther Schuller, and he also performed the final concert of Aaron Copland's tenure at the Center in Copland's As it Fell Upon a Day and in the Copland Sextet for Clarinet and String Quartet and Piano, which Copland coached.

In 1962, he won second prize in the National Competition for Woodwind Instruments, sponsored by the Musicians Club of New York.

In 1965, he was appointed as Creative Associate at the Center for Creative and Performing Arts at the State University of New York at Buffalo, Lukas and Foss, directors, under a grant from the Rockefeller Foundation. The group, which included Paul Zukofsky, Buell Neidlinger, John Bergamo and Carol Plantamura, focused on avant-garde music and performance, performing regularly in Buffalo and in New York's Carnegie Recital Hall.

Friedland was Professor of Music at Plymouth State College of the University of New Hampshire in 1968-69, and he served as Assistant Professor at Fort Lewis College in Durango, Colorado from 1969 until 1976. In 1976 he became Associate Professor of Fine Arts at Concordia University in Montreal, where he taught Clarinet and Chamber Music, and was conductor of the Concordia University Symphony Orchestra until 1993. Friedland organized, and was clarinetist and director, for the Concordia Chamber Players. His concerts as clarinetist have been reviewed by The New York Times among other publications.

He has appeared as clarinetist in over eighty-five concerts of chamber music for Radio Canada. He has also appeared in Musicien Québécois.

The Canadian composer Jean Coulthard of Vancouver composed Gardens for Mr. Friedland and Dale Bartlett, pianist. John Bavicchi, professor at Berklee College of Music in Boston, Massachusetts, composed his Sonata for Clarinet and Piano for Friedland, which was first performed at Titusville, Florida.

Friedland has recorded four compact discs for SNE Records of Montreal: The Concordia Commissions: Music, When Soft Voices Die, Vibrates in the Memory (SNE 614), Sherman Friedland in Concert (SNE 618), The Dream Itself Enchanted Me (SNE 538), and a release including the John Bavicchi's Clarinet Quintet.

Publications
Friedland ran a blog, https://web.archive.org/web/20080421215306/http://clarinet.cc/ since January 2004, answering clarinet-related questions. He has written seven hundred articles, receiving material for response from clarintists. He has written many articles on clarinet repertoire, instrumental problems and various aspects of the musical experience.

He resided in Cornwall, Ontario with his wife of 50 years, Linda, until his death, January 26, 2017. They have four grown children: Noah, Abram, and twins Nathan and Joseph.

References

1933 births
Living people
Canadian clarinetists
Male conductors (music)
Academic staff of Concordia University
People from Brooklyn
United States Army soldiers
Boston University alumni
New England Conservatory alumni
21st-century Canadian conductors (music)
21st-century clarinetists
21st-century Canadian male musicians